In mathematics, a field K is called a (non-Archimedean) local field if it is complete with respect to a topology induced by a discrete valuation v and if its residue field k is finite. Equivalently, a local field is a locally compact topological field with respect to a non-discrete topology. Sometimes, real numbers R, and the complex numbers C (with their standard topologies) are also defined to be local fields; this is the convention we will adopt below. Given a local field, the valuation defined on it can be of either of two types, each one corresponds to one of the two basic types of local fields: those in which the valuation is Archimedean and those in which it is not. In the first case, one calls the local field an Archimedean local field, in the second case, one calls it a non-Archimedean local field. Local fields arise naturally in number theory as completions of global fields.

While Archimedean local fields have been quite well known in mathematics for at least 250 years, the first examples of non-Archimedean local fields, the fields of p-adic numbers for  positive prime integer p, were introduced by Kurt Hensel  at the end of the 19th century.

Every local field is isomorphic (as a topological field) to one of the following:

Archimedean local fields (characteristic zero): the real numbers R, and the complex numbers C.
Non-Archimedean local fields of characteristic zero: finite extensions of the p-adic numbers Qp (where p is any prime number).
Non-Archimedean local fields of characteristic p (for p any given prime number): the field of formal Laurent series Fq((T)) over a finite field Fq, where q is a power of p.

In particular, of importance in number theory, classes of local fields show up as the completions of algebraic number fields with respect to their discrete valuation corresponding to one of their maximal ideals. Research papers in modern number theory often consider a more general notion, requiring only that the residue field be perfect of positive characteristic, not necessarily finite. This article uses the former definition.

Induced absolute value

Given such an absolute value on a field K, the following topology can be defined on K: for a positive real number m, define the subset Bm of K by

Then, the b+Bm make up a neighbourhood basis of b in K.

Conversely, a topological field with a non-discrete locally compact topology has an absolute value defining its topology. It can be constructed using the Haar measure of the additive group of the field.

Basic features of non-Archimedean local fields

For a non-Archimedean local field F (with absolute value denoted by |·|), the following objects are important:
its ring of integers  which is a discrete valuation ring, is the closed unit ball of F, and is compact;
the units in its ring of integers  which forms a group and is the unit sphere of F;
the unique non-zero prime ideal  in its ring of integers which is its open unit ball ;
its residue field  which is finite (since it is compact and  discrete).

Every non-zero element a of F can be written as a = ϖnu with u a unit, and n a unique integer.
The normalized valuation of F is the surjective function v : F → Z ∪ {∞} defined by sending a non-zero a to the unique integer n such that a = ϖnu with u a unit, and by sending 0 to ∞. If q is the cardinality of the residue field, the absolute value on F induced by its structure as a local field is given by:

An equivalent and very important definition of a non-Archimedean local field is that it is a field that is complete with respect to a discrete valuation and whose residue field is finite.

Examples

The p-adic numbers: the ring of integers of Qp is the ring of p-adic integers Zp. Its prime ideal is pZp and its residue field is Z/pZ. Every non-zero element of Qp can be written as u pn where u is a unit in Zp and n is an integer, then v(u pn) = n for the normalized valuation.
The formal Laurent series over a finite field: the ring of integers of Fq((T)) is the ring of formal power series Fq[[T]]. Its maximal ideal is (T) (i.e. the power series whose constant term is zero) and its residue field is Fq. Its normalized valuation is related to the (lower) degree of a formal Laurent series as follows:
 (where a−m is non-zero).
The formal Laurent series over the complex numbers is not a local field. For example, its residue field is C[[T]]/(T) = C, which is not finite.

Higher unit groups

The nth higher unit group of a non-Archimedean local field F is

for n ≥ 1. The group U(1) is called the group of principal units, and any element of it is called a principal unit. The full unit group  is denoted U(0).

The higher unit groups form a decreasing filtration of the unit group

whose quotients are given by

for n ≥ 1. (Here "" means a non-canonical isomorphism.)

Structure of the unit group

The multiplicative group of non-zero elements of a non-Archimedean local field F is isomorphic to

where q is the order of the residue field, and μq−1 is the group of (q−1)st roots of unity (in F). Its structure as an abelian group depends on its characteristic:
If F has positive characteristic p, then

where N denotes the natural numbers;
If F has characteristic zero (i.e. it is a finite extension of Qp of degree d), then

Theory of local fields 
This theory includes the study of types of local fields, extensions of local fields using Hensel's lemma, Galois extensions of local fields, ramification groups filtrations of Galois groups of local fields, the behavior of the norm map on local fields, the local reciprocity homomorphism and existence theorem in local class field theory, local Langlands correspondence, Hodge-Tate theory (also called p-adic Hodge theory), explicit formulas for the Hilbert symbol in local class field theory, see e.g.

Higher-dimensional local fields 

A local field is sometimes called a one-dimensional local field.

A non-Archimedean local field can be viewed as the field of fractions of the completion of the local ring of a one-dimensional arithmetic scheme of rank 1 at its non-singular point.

Depending on the definition of local field, a zero-dimensional local field is then either a finite field (with the definition used in this article), or a perfect field of positive characteristic.

From the geometric point of view, n-dimensional local fields with last finite residue field are naturally associated to a complete flag of subschemes of an n-dimensional arithmetic scheme.

See also
 Hensel's lemma
 Ramification group
 Local class field theory
 Higher local field

Citations

References

External links
 

Field (mathematics)
Algebraic number theory